Aware Records is an American record label. The label has worked with a range of artists, including John Mayer, Train, Five for Fighting, Mat Kearney, and Guster.

History
Aware Records was founded in 1993 by Gregg Latterman with the simple intention to find unsigned acts and increase their national exposure through a compilation album. In the fall of 1995, the label formed the inaugural Aware Tour. The first tour led to national tours from 1996 to 1999. In July 1997, Aware entered into an agreement with Columbia Records providing the major label with grassroots artist development, and Aware access to national marketing and distribution. The 2003 Aware Tour featured Toad the Wet Sprocket as headliner, with Aware bands Wheat and Bleu as supporting acts. Aware's joint venture with Columbia Records was renewed in the summer of 2002.

Through Aware's relationship with Columbia Records, they have released full-length albums by artists such as Train, Five for Fighting and John Mayer. Aware was the exclusive CD retailer for the H.O.R.D.E. tours from 1995–1998 and Woodstock '99. In July 2010 Aware's joint venture deal with Columbia expired; Aware has since signed a new deal with Universal Republic.

In 2000 Aware Records started an Internet radio station through New England Digital Arts. The agreement was that the radio broadcasts would focus on record label artist and royalties would be paid to ASCAP, BMI and SESAC.

A-Squared Management
Formed in October 1999, A-Squared Management (or A² Management) is a separate management division whose current clients include Ben Rector.

Former management clients include The Fray, Liz Phair, Brandi Carlile, Michelle Branch, Motion City Soundtrack, Jack's Mannequin, This Providence, Brendan Benson, A Rocket to the Moon, Glen Phillips (of Toad and the Wet Sprocket), and Five For Fighting.

Artists
Note: These artists have a current or previous affiliation with Aware Records; however, they may not have released any albums through the label.

 Dave Barnes
 Better than Ezra
 Bleu
 Brandi Carlile
 Nelson Chin
 Dovetail Joint
 Farmer
 Newton Faulkner
 Five for Fighting
 Guster
 Hootie and the Blowfish
 Once Hush
 Jackopierce
 Jupiter Coyote
 Mat Kearney
 Wakeland
 Edwin McCain
 John Mayer
 Mile
 Mutemath
 Matt Nathanson
 Nineteen Wheels
 Alice Peacock
 Cary Pierce
 Glen Phillips (of Toad the Wet Sprocket)
 Melissa Polinar
 Red Elephant
 Kyle Riabko
 Riddlin' Kids
 Slackjaw
 Stepanian
 Stir
 Tabitha's Secret
 Angel Taylor
 Thanks to Gravity
 The Thorns
 Train
 Vertical Horizon
 The Verve Pipe
 Matt Wertz
 Wheat
 Zach Heckendorf

References

Record labels established in 1993
American record labels
Mass media companies of the United States
Columbia Records
Pop record labels
Rock record labels